The Hamilton LRT (also known as the B-Line) is a planned light rail line in Hamilton, Ontario, Canada, to operate along Main Street, King Street, and Queenston Road. It is one of five planned rapid transit lines which form Hamilton's proposed BLAST network. The , 17-stop route is planned to extend from McMaster University to Eastgate Square via downtown Hamilton. 

The LRT was originally funded by the province of Ontario in 2015 but was then cancelled in 2019 due to rising costs. In February 2021, the province recommitted to the project, subject to additional funding from the Canadian federal government. In May 2021, the federal government committed funding for the project as part of a larger spending package to fund rapid transit initiatives in the Greater Toronto and Hamilton Area. Preliminary construction is expected to begin in mid-2022.

Route layout 

The western terminus is to be built on Main Street in front of McMaster University. The line will continue east until crossing a newly constructed bridge over Highway 403 which will connect it to downtown Hamilton via King Street. At the King–Main intersection, the line will continue on Main Street until Queenston Circle and then Queenston Road until Eastgate Square.

Stops 

Notes
All stops are located along the street's median except where noted below.

History

Planning and funding (2011–2017)
A benefits case analysis was conducted, showing a net benefit for implementing LRT, and that it would be adequate dealing with long-term travel demand growth. An environmental project report was completed in October 2011.

On May 26, 2015, the Government of Ontario announced a shorter route between McMaster University and Queenston Circle, but also including a segment of the A-Line to provide a direct connection to West Harbour GO Station, as well as a pedestrian corridor to the Hamilton GO Centre. The capital costs for the project would be $1 billion, funded entirely by the province. For the B-Line LRT, procurement was expected to begin in 2017 and line construction in 2019. The transit line was scheduled to open to the public in 2024.

On February 2, 2017, the province scrapped the A-Line spur altogether, announcing it would opt for bus rapid transit along the entire A-Line corridor from Hamilton's waterfront to the airport.

On March 28, 2017, Hamilton City Council chose to delay the crucial Environmental Assessment vote to April 19, 2017, citing they needed more time to read it for themselves. On April 19, 2017, City Council voted again to delay the Environmental Assessment, this time to April 26, 2017, claiming the plan at that stage (which was to build Phase 1 from McMaster University to Queenston traffic circle) was indefensible and unfit as it did not go from a destination location to a destination location.

On April 26, 2017, the province announced with the money saved from removing the spur line from King and James to the West Harbour GO Station, they would work with the City to get the  Eastgate Square extension included in the capital funding. Later that evening City Council voted to submit the original Environmental Assessment from October 2011 which covers the original route from McMaster University to Eastgate Square. The motion to submit the original Environmental Assessment was by Terry Whitehead, who was one of the project's harshest critics. The motion passed 10–5, with Councillor Robert Pasuta absent.

On August 4, 2017, the Ontario Ministry of the Environment and Climate Change approved the Environmental Project Report (EPR) Addendum for Hamilton's Light Rail Transit (LRT) plan.

Preparations and cancellation (2018–2019)
In 2018, before its election defeat, the previous Liberal government knew that the project cost had increased from $1 billion (established in 2014) to $2.85 billion, according to the Progressive Conservative government that succeeded it. However, Metrolinx continued to show the cost as $1 billion until late 2019.

On August 30, 2018, property acquisitions and other spending related to the project were put on hold by the newly elected provincial government. About 50 percent of the properties still needed to be purchased before completing the light rail line.

Light rail was a key issue in the 2018 Hamilton municipal election. Mayoral challenger Vito Sgro campaigned primarily on a platform of cancelling the B-Line project while incumbent mayor Fred Eisenberger was pro-LRT. On October 22, 2018, Eisenberger was re-elected to a second consecutive term (and third overall) receiving 54% of votes and claimed that the results indicated a "strong mandate on LRT to move forward."

On March 29, 2019, Ontario Transit Minister Jeff Yurek announced that project-related spending could resume after an eight-month freeze. He indicated that Metrolinx could now continue to purchase land along the route needed for LRT construction. Four days later, Metrolinx announced the purchase of a 14.5-acre property which will be the site of an operations, maintenance and storage facility (OMSF) for the light rail vehicles.

On December 16, 2019, Doug Ford's government told the City of Hamilton that the project will be terminated "effective immediately", because the estimated cost of the project had risen to an "astonishing $5.5 billion". The Mayor of Hamilton, Fred Eisenberger, called the cancellation "a betrayal by the province to the City of Hamilton." The capital expenditures had increased from $1 billion excluding financing as of 2014 to $2.85 billion including financing at the time of project cancellation. Also, the Ford government is adding the 30-year estimated cost of $1 billion for operations and maintenance to the capital and financing costs. The City of Hamilton would have been expected to pay the LRT's operating and maintenance costs. The province has already spent $184 million on the project including the acquisition of 60 properties. Consortiums who were competing to construct the LRT would be entitled to compensation as a result of the cancellation. Transportation Minister Caroline Mulroney said the province has cancelled the Hamilton LRT, but not the Hurontario LRT with similar costs, because the Hurontario project was further along and bidders on the Hamilton LRT had raised concerns about costs.

As a consolation, the provincial government offered the city $1 billion (the original estimated cost of the LRT line) to spend on other transit improvements. To this end, the provincial government set up a task force to decide on the best use for the money. In March 2020, the task force reported their preference for the funds to be spent on higher-order transit (such as light rail or bus rapid transit) along the Hamilton LRT route.

Project revival (2020–present) 
In November 2020, there was talk of the project being revived. During an announcement in Hamilton, Ontario, Premier Doug Ford said he had been working closely with Hamilton mayor Fred Eisenberger on the file but said they would need funding support from the federal government to move forward with it. The following day, then federal Minister of Infrastructure and Communities Catherine McKenna said she supported the project, and that it was up to the province to formally endorse the LRT project and submit a business case for the federal government to review. Laborers' International Union of North America's Joseph Mancinelli cited the project as an ideal stimulant of economic recovery during the COVID-19 pandemic in Ontario.

On February 9, 2021, the province confirmed its commitment to the project and added the Hamilton LRT to its slate of priority transit projects in the GTHA. The proposed route would be a shorter  kilometre line between McMaster University and Gage Avenue and would require an additional $1.5 billion in funding from the federal government.

On May 11, 2021, Prime Minister Justin Trudeau announced $1.7 billion in federal funding for the Hamilton project. The capital costs would be split equally between the federal and provincial governments for the full 14-kilometre route.

On June 2, 2021, Metrolinx and the Ontario Ministry of Transportation met with Hamilton city council to discuss operating costs (which would be funded by the city) and to agree to negotiate a memorandum of understanding (MOU). After a two-week delay, council voted 9–6 in favour of negotiating the MOU and proceeding with the LRT project.

Procurement 
Infrastructure Ontario (IO) and Metrolinx are planning to deliver the Hamilton LRT project according to IO's Alternative Financing and Procurement (AFP) model which basically is a public–private partnership arrangement. Teams shortlisted by IO and Metrolinx allowed to bid for the design, construction, equipment, financing and operations and maintenance of the project are: 
 CityLine Transit Group including equity providers ACS, Aecon, CRH and TIAA. In the CityLine Transit Group team the constructors are Dragados, Aecon and Dufferin. The designers are Parsons, HDR, Wood (formerly AMEC) and RDHA. Operation and maintenance providers are ACS, Aecon, CRH and Serco.
 Ei8ht Transit including equity providers EllisDon, Fluor and Bombardier. In the Ei8ht Transit team, the constructors are Fluor, EllisDon and Bombardier. The designers are WSP/MMM, Hatch, Gh3 and Bombardier. Operation and maintenance providers are EllisDon Facilities Services and Bombardier.
 Mobilinx including equity providers Astaldi, John Laing, Hitachi-Ansaldo STS, Transdev and Amico. In the Mobilinx team, the constructors are Astaldi, Hitachi-Ansaldo, Amico and Bot. The designers are IBI, Hitachi-Ansaldo, Daoust Lestage, Morrison Hershfield, Exp Services and Arcadis. Operation and maintenance providers are Transdev, Hitachi-Ansaldo and Astaldi.
The procurement of a dedicated fleet of light rail vehicles and the construction of a maintenance and storage facility is included in the deal. The deadline to submit bids was originally scheduled for April 2019 but was later extended by six months.  As of 2019, no vehicles have been chosen, but the trains could be similar to the Flexity Freedom cars to be used in Waterloo Region's Ion rapid transit and Toronto's Eglinton Crosstown LRT or the Alstom Citadis Spirit cars ordered by Metrolinx as a backup fleet for Eglinton Crosstown LRT.

Operations 
 The B-Line LRT route is currently served by the 10 B-Line Express HSR bus.
 The trip is expected to take 32 minutes from end-to-end running at a frequency of every 6 minutes during peak hours.
 The  route will include 17 stops placed approximately 600–800 metres apart.
 The B-Line will use a 30-metre light rail vehicle with a capacity of about 130 passengers. Platforms being built are 60 metres to support future trains of 2 light rail vehicles in length.
 An operations, maintenance and storage facility (OMSF) is planned to be located near a new extension of Frid Street, east of Longwood Road.

References

External links

 Hamilton LRT Project, Metrolinx project site
 Hamilton Light Rail Transit, City of Hamilton 
 Metrolinx scheme plans
 BCA Consultation boards
 Hamilton Light Rail - Site for an advocacy group 

Passenger rail transport in Hamilton, Ontario
Proposed public transport in the Greater Toronto Area
Light rail in Canada
The Big Move projects